Kiran Segal is an Indian classical dancer known for her proficiency in Odissi, a classical dance form from India. She is the daughter of actor Zohra Segal, a 1998 winner of Padma Shri award and has written a book, Zohra Segal - Fatty, on her mother. A disciple of M. K. Saroja, Segal has performed at various stages around the world. She was honored by the Government of India, in 2002, with the fourth highest Indian civilian award of Padma Shri.

See also
 Odissi
 Zohra Segal

References

Recipients of the Padma Shri in arts
Living people
Performers of Indian classical dance
Odissi exponents
Artists from Mumbai
Indian female classical dancers
20th-century Indian dancers
20th-century Indian women artists
Dancers from Maharashtra
Women artists from Maharashtra
Recipients of the Sangeet Natak Akademi Award
Year of birth missing (living people)